Cardinal is the debut album by American indie pop duo Cardinal, released in 1994.

Track listing
"If You Believe in Christmas Trees" – 3:59
"Last Poems" – 2:41
"Big Mink" – 2:50
"You've Lost Me There" – 4:28
"Public Melody #1" – 1:35
"Dream Figure" – 3:01
"Tough Guy Tactics" – 2:26
"Angel Darling" – 2:52
"Singing to the Sunshine" – 2:46
"Silver Machines" – 3:54

2005 expanded edition bonus tracks
"Forest Theme" – 0:43
"If You Believe in Christmas Trees" (demo) – 3:52
"Willow Willow" – 2:42
"You've Lost Me There" (demo) – 5:15
"Outtake" – 0:13
"Tribute to a Cow" – 1:26
"Tough Guy Tactics" (demo) – 2:28
"Say the Words Impossible" (demo) – 2:43
"Poolside '75" – 1:46
"Sweatshirt Gown" – 1:21
"Say the Words Impossible" – 3:26

References

1994 debut albums
Cardinal (band) albums